Maroa-Forsyth High School (MFHS) is a four-year public high school located in Maroa, Illinois, United States. Maroa is located between Forsyth and Clinton and is near Bloomington. It serves students in the Forsyth, Maroa, and Decatur area. The school mascot is a Trojan and the school colors are blue and gold.

Notable alumni
 Kevin Koslofski, class of 1984, played Major League Baseball for the Kansas City Royals and Milwaukee Brewers
 Jeff Query, class of 1985, played for the Green Bay Packers
 Amber Patton, class of 2005, played National Pro Fastpitch for the Chicago Bandits

References

External links
 

Public high schools in Illinois
Schools in Macon County, Illinois